Pride is a high sense of the worth of one's self and one's own, or a pleasure taken in the contemplation of these things

Pride may also refer to:
 Pride (sin), one of the "seven deadly sins"

Places
United States
 Pride, Alabama, an unincorporated community
 Pride, Louisiana, an unincorporated community
 Pride, Ohio, an unincorporated community

People
 Pride (surname)

Arts, entertainment and media

Fictional entities
 Pride (comics), a group of Supervillains in the Marvel Comics series Runaways
 Pride (Fullmetal Alchemist), the evil homunculus from the Fullmetal Alchemist manga and anime series
 Pride, a fictional character from the TV series The Tribe

Films
 Pride (1938 film), a 1938 Italian film starring Fosco Giachetti
 Pride (1955 film), a 1955 Spanish film
 Pride (1998 film), a 1998 Japanese film
 Pride (2004 film), a 2004 British film
 Pride (2007 film), an American sports film starring Terrence Howard
 Pride (2014 film), a 2014 British film

Music

Albums
 Pride (Arena album)
 The Pride (InMe album)
 Pride (Johnna album)
 Pride (Living Colour album)
 Pride (Prosphorescent album)
 Pride (Robert Palmer album)
 Pride (White Lion album)
 Pride (Yaki-da album)
 Pride: A Tribute to Charley Pride, by Neal McCoy
 Pride: The Royal Philharmonic Orchestra Plays U2, a U2 cover album by the Royal Philharmonic Orchestra

Songs 
 "Pride" (Amy Macdonald song)
 "Pride" (High and Mighty Color song)
 "The Pride" (The Isley Brothers song)
 "Pride" (Janie Fricke song)
 "Pride" (Kendrick Lamar song)
 "Pride" (Nothing's Carved in Stone song)
 "Pride" (Scandal song)
 "Pride" (Simon Collins song)
 "Pride (In the Name of Love)", a song by U2
 "Bold & Delicious/Pride", a song by Ayumi Hamasaki
 "Pride", by American Authors from What We Live For
 "Pride", by Damageplan from New Found Power
 "Pride", by Echo & The Bunnymen from Crocodiles
 "The Pride", by Five Finger Death Punch from American Capitalist
 "Pride", by Hüsker Dü from Zen Arcade
 "Pride", by Johnna from Pride
 "Pride", by Leanne Mitchell from her self-titled album
 "Pride", by Living Colour from Time's Up
 "Pride", by Mussorgsky
 "Pride", by Robert Palmer from Pride
 "Pride", by Robin Schulz from Sugar
 "Pride", by Saliva from Back Into Your System
 "Pride", by Seether from Disclaimer II
 "Pride", by SOiL from Redefine
 "Pride", by Syntax from Meccano Mind

Television
 "Pride" (Degrassi: The Next Generation), an episode of Degrassi: The Next Generation
 "Pride" (Law & Order), an episode of Law & Order
 Pride (American TV series), an American documentary television series, first broadcast in 2021
 Pride (Japanese TV series), a Japanese drama starring Takuya Kimura, first broadcast in 2004
 Pride (Canadian TV series), a Canadian documentary television series, first broadcast in 2019
 Pride: The Series, an American drama series, broadcast from 2013

Other arts, entertainment, and media
 Pride (manga), a manga and a 2009 Japanese film based on it
 Pride Magazine, a British lifestyle magazine
 Pride.com, an online LGBT social network
 The Pride (play), a play by Alexi Kaye Campbell
 The Pride LA, a newspaper serving the Los Angeles LGBT community published by the Mirror Media Group
 The Pride of West Virginia, the official nickname of the West Virginia University Mountaineer Marching Band

Brands and enterprises
 Pride, a defunct brand of furniture polish made by Johnson Wax
 Pride Microfinance Limited

Identity movements
Pride, shorthand for any of several similarly named identity movements, including:
 Black pride
 LGBT pride
 Pride parade
Disability pride
 Autistic pride
Mad pride
 Pagan Pride
 Straight pride
 White pride

Organizations
 Personal Responsibility in a Desirable Environment, or PRIDE, a non-profit organization
 Personal Rights in Defense and Education, or PRIDE, an LGBT political organization

Science
 Pride, a family group of lions
 Planetary Radio Interferometer & Doppler Experiment, or PRIDE, a scientific payload on board the Jupiter Icy Moon Explorer (JICE)
 Pride of Barbados, a plant
 Programme for Reusable In-orbit Demonstrator in Europe, or PRIDE, a European Space Agency (ESA) unmanned spaceplane project
 Proteomics Identifications Database, or PRIDE

Sports
 Pride (horse), a champion French racemare
Pride, the athletic teams of Hofstra University
 Pride, the name of the University of Prince Edward Island mascot
 Mississippi Pride, a professional American football team in 1999
 Nashua Pride, a Can-Am League baseball team
 New Jersey Pride, a professional lacrosse team in Major League Lacrosse
 Orlando Pride, a women's professional soccer team in the National Women's Soccer League
 PRIDE Fighting Championships, a major mixed martial arts organization in Japan
USSSA Pride, a women's professional softball team

Transportation
 PRIDE, Melbourne rail network, a system used for announcements and timetable information at Melbourne railway stations
 Carnival Pride, a Spirit class cruise ship operated by Carnival Cruise Line
 Kia Pride, a car built by Kia Motors
 Pride Air, a defunct United States airline
 Seabulk Pride, an oil tanker

See also
Pryde